Volzhsky Utyos Rural Settlement is an administrative and municipal division (a rural settlement) of Shigonsky District of Samara Oblast, Russia. Its administrative center is the rural locality (a settlement) of Volzhsky Utyos. Population: 2,303 (2010 Census);

Settlements
 Berezovka
 Komarovka
 Volzhsky Utyos (administrative center)

References

Notes

Rural settlements of Russia

